Castel (Guernésiais: Lé Casté; French: Sainte-Marie-du-Câtel) is the largest parish in Guernsey in terms of area.

The old Guernésiais nickname for people from Castel was ânes pur sàng.

The parish plays host to both Le Viaër Marchi and the North Show which includes the Battle of Flowers annually. It also produces a regular magazine called Castel Matters.

The postal code for street addresses in this parish begins with GY5.

Parish church 

The parish church of St Marie de Castel, also known as Notre Dame de la Délivrance, was consecrated on 25 August 1203. It is notable for its preserved medieval fresco.

A pre-Christian neolithic menhir dating from 2,500-1,800 BC in the churchyard, carved to represent a female, with breasts and a necklace in relief,  possibly a fertility symbol. It was discovered under the floor of the church in 1878, possibly buried there to rid the church of a link to the older pagan beliefs.

In the churchyard is the tomb of James Saumarez, 1st Baron de Saumarez GCB, an admiral of the British Royal Navy.

The church is thought to be built on an ancient fort, hence the name Castel or Câtel, possibly a corruption of the Roman Castellum or castrum. In the area broken Roman roof tiles and pottery have been discovered, indicating Roman occupation.

Features

Features of the parish include:
 Ste. Marie de Castel church
 Saumarez Park
 National Trust of Guernsey Folk & Costume Museum
 Fairfield
 Military:
 Parish war memorial inside church 
 Tower 12, Vazon Bay 
 Hougue Batteries Left & Right dating from the Napoleonic Wars
 Grandes Rocques Battery dating from the Napoleonic Wars
 Burton Battery dating from the Napoleonic Wars
 Le Guet watchhouse
 Fort Hommet, at Vazon 
 Fort Hommet 10.5 cm Coastal Defence Gun Casement Bunker at Vazon 
 German fortifications, built during the occupation 1940-45
 Archaeology:
 Castel Church Statue Menhir
 Beaches
 Cobo 
 Grandes Rocques (Saline) (MCS recommended)
 Port Soif (MCS recommended)
 Vazon (MCS recommended)
 Albecq
 Nature reserves
 Fort Hommet 
 Port Soif/Portinfer
 Rue de Bergers 
 Le Guet
 Cobo village
 Kings Mills village
 Fauxquets Valley
 Talbot Valley
 A number of protected buildings 
 Abreuvoirs (places for cattle to drink)

The parish of the Castel hosts:
 La Chambre de la Douzaine
 Castel School, a primary school 
 La Mare de Carteret School
 Les Beaucamps High School
 Cobo community centre
 La Grande Mare golf course
 King George V Playing Fields
 Guernsey Indoor Bowls Centre
 King George VII Hospital
 Guernsey Rovers AC ground 
 Battle of Flowers, an annual event
 Le Viaër Marchi, an annual community event
 Numerous hotels and restaurants
 Surf school at Vazon
 Country walks

Politics
The Castel comprises the whole of the Castel administrative division

In the 2016 Guernsey general election there was 3,262 or 73%, turnout to elect five Deputies. Those elected (in order of votes received) being Richard Graham, Chris Green, Barry Paint, Mark Dorey and Jonathan Le Tocq.

References

External links
Castel parish website
Parish information
King George V Memorial Playing Field Trust

Castel